Jaq Grantford (born 1967) is an Australian portrait artist, fine artist and sculptor.

Biography

Jaq Grantford grew up in Melbourne, Australia.

Career

Grantford has won numerous awards, including the Darling Portrait Prize with the National Portrait Gallery of Australia and the Kennedy Art Prize in 2019. Other awards include the Master of Art International Art Prize in London, the People's Choice for the Shirley Hannan Portrait Prize, the People's Choice for the Black Swan Heritage Prize, and the People's Choice for the Lester Portrait Prize.

In addition to working as a portrait artist and fine artist, Grantford has been publishing books since 2002. A True Person, written by Gabian Marin was one of the 250 outstanding new international books for children and young adults that have been selected for The White Ravens 2008. This book, along with Squeezy Cuddle Dangly Legs written by Peter Whitfield, and Molly's Memory Jar by Norma Spalding have been listed as recommended books in the Family Therapist Awards.

Her portraits include Jacki Weaver, Johnny Young, Bud Tingwell, Mick Malthouse, Eddie Ayres, Noni Hazlehurst and Elena Kats-Chernin.

Bibliography

Picture books written and illustrated by Jacqui Grantford
 Shoes News, Lothian, 2003
 Various Faerious, Lothian, 2002
 The Hush Treasure Book, Allen & Unwin, 2016. Contributed to this book along with 30 other authors and illustrators from Australia

Picture books illustrated by Jacqui Grantford

 Nancy Bentleigh, Tracey Hawkins, New Frontier, 2010
Molly’s Memory Jar, Norma Spalding, New Frontier, 2010
 Thank You Wishes, Kate Wilson, JoJo Publishing, 2009
 A True Person,  Marrian Gabbin, New Frontier, 2007
 Squeezy Cuddle Dangly Legs, Peter  Whitfield, New Frontier, 2007
 Pemberthy Bear, Sally Murphy, New Frontier, 2005
 Wishes For One more Day, Melanie Joy Pastor, Flashlight Press,2005

References

External links
 Jaqgrantford.com

1967 births
Living people
Australian illustrators
Australian women artists